This is a list of Tamil national-type primary schools (or SJK (T) in short) in Malaysia, arranged according to states. As of June 2022, there are 528 Tamil primary schools with a total of 79,309 students.

Statistics

List of Tamil national-type primary schools in Malaysia
Details of every schools are listed in separate pages according to states and federal territories. Kelantan and Perlis are listed at the bottom because there is only one school each. There are currently no Tamil schools in Terengganu, Sabah, Sarawak, Labuan and Putrajaya.

List of Tamil national-type primary schools in Kelantan 

This is a list of Tamil national-type primary schools (SJK(T)) in Kelantan, Malaysia. As of June 2022, there are 1 Tamil primary schools with a total of 36 students.

List of Tamil national-type primary schools in Perlis 

This is a list of Tamil national-type primary schools (SJK(T)) in Perlis, Malaysia. As of June 2022, there are 1 Tamil primary schools with a total of 66 students.

See also
List of schools in Malaysia
Tamil primary schools in Malaysia

Footnotes

References

Schools in Malaysia